The Port of Jingtang is an artificial deep-water international seaport on the coast of Tangshan Municipality, Hebei, in Northern China. It is part of the Tangshan port complex, which consists of Jingtang, Caofeidian and Fengnan ports. Combined, they constitute the 9th largest port in China.

Jingtang port is  separately but considered along with Caofeidian and Fengnan as Tangshan port for statistical purposes. The Port of Tangshan is one of the fastest growing ports in the world and is counted among the ten largest ports of China.

History

Location and Layout
Jingtang port is located in Bohai bay (Bohai sea) close to the port of Tianjin. 

It is part of Tangshan port (along with Caofeidian and Fengnan), though Jingtang has a separate UN Locode and is specified as a separate entity in maritime charter parties and in bills of lading. The closest airport to the port is that of Tianjin which is about 2 hours away. A new high speed train under construction is expected to shorten the distance from Beijing to Tangshan to  even lesser.

Administration

Operations

References

External links
Jingtang Port website
Caofeidian Port website
Hebei Port Group website

Ports and harbours of China